The Dodge Diplomat is an American mid-size car that was produced by Dodge from 1977 to 1989. At launch, it shared a common design with the Chrysler LeBaron and for much of its later production run was the counterpart of the more upscale Chrysler Fifth Avenue and lower priced Plymouth Gran Fury. It was also sold in Mexico between 1981 and 1982 as the Dodge Dart, and in Colombia as the Dodge Coronet. The Diplomat was initially offered in a coupe and a sedan; in 1978, station wagons were added as replacements for the discontinued full-sized C-body wagons.

The Diplomat was offered with a  straight-6 engine a well as optional  and  V8s. The Diplomat, along with its Plymouth Gran Fury/Caravelle twin, were popular police cars both in North America. The three-speed Torqueflite automatic transmission was most popular, but a manual transmission was available until 1981 only on six cylinder and 318 V8 models.

Background
The Diplomat name was originally used by Dodge on 2-door hardtop models from 1950 to 1954. It was also used on the export version of the DeSoto from 1946 through 1962. From 1975 through 1977, the Diplomat name was also used on a trim package available on the Royal Monaco two-door hardtop. Starting with the 1977 model year, the Diplomat became a full model line, rather than as the name of a particular body style.

First generation (1977)

Introduced as a late 1977 model during spring 1977, the first generation Diplomats were a longer, designated as Chrysler's M Body cars sharing much with the Chrysler LeBaron, both of which shared much with F-body Aspen and Plymouth Volare. The chassis and mechanical components are similar with doors and various other body panels interchangeable with the Aspens. Unique to the Diplomat were the front and rear header panels, bumpers, hood and trunk lid. Larger taillights extended into the rear hatch of the station wagon. The station wagons were shorter than the sedans and coupes, which had unique bodywork with a longer rear overhang. The station wagon, introduced for the 1978 model year, used the same rear sheetmetal as the Aspen/Volaré, albeit with its own wraparound taillights.

The first year models were available in base and Medallion trim levels; the base engine was the 318 Lean Burn V8 developing  and the  Slant Six was a credit option. A vinyl roof was standard on sedans, while a simulated landau roof cover was an option on coupes. For 1978 the Slant Six with a four-speed manual transmission became the base drivetrain, and the station wagon was added. The wagon featured "teakwood"-grain body appliques (a delete option) and was only available in base trim. The sedans and coupes continued largely unchanged, but a low-cost "Diplomat S" was added. This model was offered for one year, and the 3,322 produced represented only about 5% of overall Diplomat production in 1978. The V8's output dropped by five horsepower, but on the other hand, a   V8 became a new option.

For the 1979 model year, the Diplomat received a minor facelift. The grille was now divided into three rows of eight rectangular openings with an internal crosshatch pattern and a broad band on top. The sedan and coupe taillights were also altered, now with a horizontal theme while divided down the middle. The lineup was rearranged, with the base model decontented and a Salon model (corresponding to last year's base version) fitting in the middle below the Medallion. The new base model did not receive the padded vinyl roof (sedans). Coupes had a new landau top design, with much smaller rear side windows. The station wagon came in Salon trim, without any actual changes in equipment. V8 outputs dropped by five horsepower, to  respectively, but optional was a four-barrel 360 producing . This was the last year for the 360 engine in the Diplomat.

Second generation (1980)

The 1980 model year brought new exterior sheet metal for the Diplomat, although wagons were unchanged from the doors back. While the previous coupes used the same 112.7 inch wheelbase as the other models, the 1980 coupe used the 108 inch wheelbase of the Aspen coupe (though the square body was very different).  The front end was more evolutionary than revolutionary, but in order to share a hood with the newly restyled Chrysler LeBaron the grille was narrowed considerably.  The roofline of the sedan was also made more square, marginally improving headroom, and conservative, Buick-like taillights appeared on all but the wagons.  Manual transmissions were dropped. Following the discontinuing of the Dodge St. Regis R-body in 1981, the Diplomat became the largest sedan in the Dodge lineup, despite technically being a mid-size car. Dodge would not market another truly full-size car (at least based upon United States Environmental Protection Agency (EPA) passenger volume statistics) until the Monaco debuted as a 1990 model.

By 1981, Chrysler was switching to smaller front-wheel drive designs. However, its older and larger rear-wheel drive Dodge Diplomat (as well as the Chrysler LeBaron and Fifth Avenue) continued to sell. Chrysler's then executive vice president for manufacturing, Steve Sharf, met with officials at American Motors (AMC) to use the extra capacity at an assembly plant in Kenosha, Wisconsin to build the cars. Chrysler's tooling was moved from St. Louis to Kenosha, and from 1987 until 1989 about 250,000 Chrysler and Dodge models were built by AMC at a lower cost than Chrysler could. This relationship evolved into Chrysler's purchase of AMC in 1987.

In 1982, the coupe and station wagon were discontinued and Canada's Plymouth version of the Diplomat came south of the border. The Plymouth Caravelle was offered in the United States as the Plymouth Gran Fury. 1983 was the last year for the Slant Six, and afterwards, the only available engine was the 318-cid V8 with a two-barrel carburetor. A four-barrel 318 remained the optional engine choice for the police package. For 1984, the appearance of the upscale Special Edition or SE used the Fifth Avenue's front end with its parking lights located above the headlights, and a bright metal cross overlaid on the Chrysler grille's thin vertical bars.  The SE had more exterior trim and an interior that placed the SE between the Diplomat Salon and the Chrysler Fifth Avenue.

As the 1980s progressed, fewer private customers purchased the Diplomat, and the M-body was eventually dropped during the 1989 model year. Sales of cars equipped with the Police Package represented about half of the Diplomat production after the discontinuation of the coupe and station wagons. Late in the Diplomat's run, the car was subject to the federal "Gas Guzzler Tax" and required premium unleaded gasoline. Although sales were strong, Chrysler CEO Lee Iacocca held a low opinion of the M-body line as a relic of the pre-K car era and declined to invest any money in them. Despite lower gas prices in the mid- to late-1980s and a 2.26:1 rear-end gear ratio, the Diplomat's carbureted engine and lack of an overdrive gear on its TorqueFlite automatic transmission resulted in poor fuel economy compared with its larger competitors from Ford and General Motors, as evidenced by comparing the EPA estimates for 1986 models:

 Dodge Diplomat (5.2 L V8, 3-speed automatic): 16 city, 21 highway, 18 combined
 Chevrolet Caprice (5.0 L V8, 4-speed automatic with overdrive): 17 city, 25 highway, 20 combined
 Ford LTD Crown Victoria (5.0 L V8, 4-speed automatic with overdrive): 18 city, 26 highway, 21 combined

However, Diplomats built from mid-1988 until the end of production were among the first Chrysler-built products to have a driver's side airbag as standard equipment, some two model years before the remainder of Chrysler's lineup and they were also among the only cars at the time to offer a tilt steering column with an airbag. Diplomats with airbags differed from earlier models in that they were also equipped with a padded, color-keyed knee blocker which extended out from beneath the instrument panel in front of the driver.

Production Figures:

(For 1979 and 1981, coupe and sedan figures were not listed separately)

Discontinuation
When the Diplomat and similar Plymouth Gran Fury were discontinued, it marked the last rear-wheel drive sedan sold by the corporation until the Dodge Magnum and Chrysler 300 were introduced in 2005.  The Diplomat's other rear-wheel drive sibling, the Chrysler Fifth Avenue, also ended production, but the nameplate was continued on a front-wheel drive chassis. In the Dodge lineup, the Monaco became the top-of-the-line sedan until the introduction of the LH platform.

References

 Local Dragster Makes NHRA History
 Mopar Muscle Magazine's Stealthbomber

External links

 The Dodge Diplomat / Plymouth Gran Fury

Diplomat
Rear-wheel-drive vehicles
Mid-size cars
Coupés
Sedans
Station wagons
Cars introduced in 1977

1980s cars
Police vehicles
Taxi vehicles